Corobicí is an extinct Chibchan lect of Costa Rica. Many authors consider it a dialect of Guatuso; others consider it (or at least the words which are claimed to be recorded in it) as Rama. 

Mason considered it a variety of the Guatuso language in a "Rama-Corobici" subfamily of Chibchan. The 1950 Handbook of South American Indians agreed that Corobici was Guatuso, but not with the subfamily classification, saying "Guatuso, with its variety Corobici or Corbesi, and Rama with its dialect Melchora, are obviously very different from each other and from other Central American Chibchan languages, and Mason (1940) was evidently in error in making a Rama-Corobici subfamily." Voegelin and Voegelin also consider it a variety of Guatuso. Tozzer considers the Guatuso descendants of the Corobici, whereas Samuel Kirkland Lothrop writes that "It is generally assumed that the Rama were once a tribe identical in language and speech with the Corobici." Constenla writes that the extant "small sample of" Corobici is actually "words from the dialect of Rama that was spoken in the region of Upala, Costa Rica, up to the 1920s. Really, not a single word of the language of the Corobicies (an extinct group) was recorded."

References

 J. Alden Mason, The native languages of Middle America (1940) and The languages of South American Indians (1950)
 Charles Frederick Voegelin, Florence Marie Voegelin, Classification and Index of the World's Languages (1977)
 Adolfo Constenla, Comparative Chibchan Phonology (1981)
 Alfred Marston Tozzer, The Maya and Their Neighbors

Chibchan languages
Languages of Costa Rica
Extinct languages of North America